Plaza de Toros Monumental de Maracaibo is a stadium in Maracaibo, Venezuela. It was used for bull fighting until 2017 when the government of Maracaibo prohibited that activity due to being considered animal cruelty. The venue holds 15,000 people and was built in 1972.

Resources 

Buildings and structures completed in 1972
Monumental de Maracaibo
Buildings and structures in Maracaibo